Cassine is a genus of trees, of the plant family Celastraceae.

Description
Cassine species grow as shrubs or small trees. The flowers are bisexual. The fruits have a pit (stone).

Distribution and habitat
Cassine species are distributed widely throughout the tropics, mainly in Africa.

Species
 The Plant List recognises 68 accepted taxa (of species and infraspecific names):

 Cassine aethiopica  
 Cassine albens  
 Cassine albivenosa  
 Cassine anjouanensis  
 Cassine aquifolium  
 Cassine australis  
 var. angustifolia  
 Cassine balae  
 Cassine brachycremastra  
 Cassine buchananii  
 Cassine bupleuroides  
 Cassine burkeana  
 Cassine comorensis  
 Cassine confertiflora  
 Cassine congylos  
 Cassine crocea  
 Cassine cubensis  
 Cassine cunninghamii  
 Cassine curtipendula  
 Cassine ehrenbergii  
 Cassine elliptica  
 Cassine eucleiformis  
 Cassine glauca  
 Cassine grossa  
 Cassine gymnosporiodes  
 Cassine humbertii  
 Cassine kamerunensis  
 Cassine kamurensis  
 Cassine kedarnathii  
 Cassine koordersii  
 Cassine lanceolata  
 Cassine laneana  
 Cassine lippoldii  
 Cassine lyciodes  
 Cassine macrocarpa  
 Cassine maritima  
 Cassine matabelica  
 Cassine megaphylla  
 Cassine melanocarpa  
 Cassine micrantha  
 Cassine nipensis  
 Cassine nitidula  
 Cassine obiensis  
 Cassine oligantha  
 Cassine orientalis  
 Cassine paniculata  
 Cassine papillosa  
 Cassine parvifolia  
 Cassine pauciflora  
 Cassine peragua  
 subsp. affinis  
 subsp. barbata  
 Cassine pilosa  
 Cassine pininsularis  
 subsp. poyaensis  
 Cassine quadrangulata  
 Cassine reticulata  
 Cassine schinoides  
 Cassine schlechteriana  
 Cassine schweinfurthiana  
 Cassine tetragona  
 Cassine trachyclada  
 Cassine transvaalensis  
 Cassine trinitensis  
 Cassine vacciniodes  
 Cassine viburnifolia  
 Cassine vitiensis  
 Cassine xylocarpa

References

Celastrales genera